Erica Luttrell is a Canadian actress.

Personal life
Luttrell was born in Toronto, Ontario to a Tanzanian mother and an American father. Luttrell is the youngest of four sisters. She can speak some French and Swahili.  In August 2019, Luttrell married her girlfriend Jessica Mallers.

Career
She began her acting career at age 2 in several Pampers and Cadillac commercials. At age 9, she had her first starring role in a television series. Her older sister Rachel Luttrell is also an actress who is best known for her role as Teyla Emmagan in the science fiction television series Stargate Atlantis.

Luttrell is best known for her role as Kara Cupper on the children's television series Shining Time Station, and the voice of Keesha Franklin on The Magic School Bus. In 1997, she starred as Emelie Robeson on The New Ghostwriter Mysteries. After several seasons of those and other TV series, she moved south to Los Angeles, California. In 2004, Luttrell was the voice of Candy on the short-lived Disney Channel animated series Dave the Barbarian. She also voices Sapphire in the Cartoon Network series Steven Universe, Glori in Mighty Magiswords and Emily Kaldwin in the 2016 video game Dishonored 2, Cheetah in the 2017 fighting video game Injustice 2, as well as Bangalore in Apex Legends. She also starred in the CBS sci-fi drama Salvation.

Filmography

Video games

References

External links
 Official Website
 

Living people
20th-century Canadian actresses
20th-century Canadian LGBT people
21st-century Canadian actresses
21st-century Canadian LGBT people
Actresses from Toronto
Black Canadian actresses
Canadian child actresses
Canadian expatriate actresses in the United States
Canadian expatriates in the United States
Canadian film actresses
Canadian lesbian actresses
Canadian people of American descent
Canadian people of Tanzanian descent
Canadian television actresses
Canadian video game actresses
Canadian voice actresses
Year of birth missing (living people)